Obadiah H. Platt was a pioneer in the settlement of Tampa, Florida The First Congregational Church at 2201 North Florida Avenue was dedicated to him in 1906 after the congregation moved from downtown Tampa.

References

People from Tampa, Florida
History of Tampa, Florida
Year of birth missing
Year of death missing